The 1956 Five Nations Championship was the twenty-seventh series of the rugby union Five Nations Championship. Including the previous incarnations as the Home Nations and Five Nations, this was the sixty-second series of the northern hemisphere rugby union championship. Ten matches were played between 14 January and 14 April. It was contested by England, France, Ireland, Scotland and Wales.

Participants
The teams involved were:

Table

Results

External links

The official RBS Six Nations Site

Six Nations Championship seasons
Five Nations
Five Nations
Five Nations
Five Nations
Five Nations
Five Nations